Maurice Egan House is a historic home located at South Bend, St. Joseph County, Indiana. It was built in 1889, and is a -story, rectangular, Queen Anne style yellow ochre brick dwelling.  It has a two-story wing and features a wraparound porch.

It was listed on the National Register of Historic Places in 1999.

References

Houses on the National Register of Historic Places in Indiana
Queen Anne architecture in Indiana
Houses completed in 1889
Buildings and structures in South Bend, Indiana
Houses in St. Joseph County, Indiana
National Register of Historic Places in St. Joseph County, Indiana